Nilkanth Singh Munda (born 1968) is an Indian political leader and a 5th term MLA from Khunti constituency. He was a Minister of Parliamentary Affairs and Rural Development in the Government of Jharkhand. He is one of the chief Bharatiya Janata Party leaders in the state.

Personal life
He has five siblings. He is married to Sarita Devi and has two daughters and a son.

Early life and education 
He was born in the village of Mahil which is in the district of Khunti on 5 January 1968 to T. Muchirai Munda and Radhika Munda. His father was also a political leader. He passed his matriculation exam in 1984. He completed his graduation in B.A. from Magadha University in 1988.

Political Journey 

Munda fought 2000 legislative election from Khunti on BJP’s ticket and became an MLA. He also won the Vidhan Sabha Elections in 2005, 2009, and 2014. He was given the charge of the Land Revenue by the previous Jharkhand Government and was working as the Minister of Parliamentary Affairs and Rural Development.

References 

1968 births
Living people
Jharkhand MLAs 2014–2019
Magadh University alumni
State cabinet ministers of Jharkhand
Bharatiya Janata Party politicians from Jharkhand
Members of the Jharkhand Legislative Assembly